Deutsche Regional Aircraft GmbH (commonly referred to as DRA GmbH and branded simply as "Deutsche Aircraft") is a German aircraft manufacturer based in Oberpfaffenhofen, Germany.

History
Following the bankruptcy of Fairchild Dornier, AvCraft Aviation acquired the Dornier 328 and Dornier 328JET rights, but this company entered bankruptcy itself less than three years later.
In June 2006, 328 Support Services GmbH acquired the type certificate for the Dornier 328.
It provides maintenance, repair, and overhaul services to the existing in-service fleet.

In February 2015, US engineering company Sierra Nevada Corporation acquired 328 Support Services GmbH.
Shortly thereafter, Sierra Nevada's owner, Turkish-American engineer Fatih Ozmen established a private corporation in Turkey, and signed a memorandum of understanding with the Transportation Ministry of Turkey to manufacture the 328 at Ankara. While first flight was anticipated in 2019, Turkey abandoned the program in October 2017, after facing increasing costs and being no longer confident of market demand forecasts.
Sierra Nevada Corporation and 328 Support Services GmbH searched for other means to revive the aircraft, hoping to follow through by the end of 2017 or early 2018.

On 21 August 2019, 328 Support Services GmbH announced the formation of DRA GmbH to establish its final assembly line for the D328NEU at Leipzig/Halle Airport, creating of up to 250 new jobs there and over 100 jobs in Oberpfaffenhofen, near Munich; the programme should be detailed late in the first quarter of 2020. The company signed a MoU with the federal authorities of Germany, and State of Saxony ministries.
To revive the turboprop design, Sierra Nevada Corporation should invest €80 million ($88.75 million) in DRA GmbH while the state of Saxony pledged €6.5 million. 

On 29 April 2020, DRA GmbH rebranded its proposed D328NEU as the “D328eco” and hired a former Airbus specialist in alternative propulsion as its chief technology officer (CTO). DRA GmbH would not be able to use the name "Dornier", as the trademark belongs to Airbus and it is used by its subsidiary Dornier Consulting. Instead, DRA GmbH created a new brand, Deutsche Aircraft, making reference to German engineering and German quality.

On 7 December 2020, Deutsche Aircraft presented the D328eco. Deutsche Aircraft plan to stretch by  the D328eco to 23.3m (76.4ft), to carry up to 43 passengers: 10 more than the original 328. 

On 2 February 2021, Dave Jackson in an interview with aeroTELEGRAPH mentioned "We see three market segments. The biggest and most important is the replacement of ageing turboprops with around 50 seats, for example Saab 340, Jetstream or the smaller Dash 8. They are usually more than 25 years old. We are talking about a potential of around 4,000 aircraft."

Products

Aircraft in development

See also

 Dornier Flugzeugwerke
 Dornier 328

References

Aerospace companies of Europe
Aircraft manufacturers of Germany
 
Transport companies of Europe